Vilmos Benczik (11 July 1945 – 27 February 2021) was a Hungarian linguist, translator, and writer who specialized in the Esperanto language.

From 1977 to 1980, he was Editor-in-Chief of the magazine . In 1979, he became a committee member of the Universal Esperanto Association, and served as its  president from 1986 to 2002. In 2001, he was first elected into the Akademio de Esperanto, and was reelected in 2010 and 2019.

Vilmos Benczik died in Budapest on 27 February 2021 at the age of 75.

References

Hungarian Esperantists
1945 births
2021 deaths
Linguists from Hungary